Hebachang is a township located in Deyang prefecture, Sichuan province in China.

Township-level divisions of Sichuan
Deyang